Stylocephalidae is a family of parasitic alveolates of the phylum Apicomplexia

Taxonomy

Fifteen genera are recognised in this family.

History

This taxon was created by Ellis in 1912.

Description

Species in this taxon infect insects.

References

Conoidasida
Apicomplexa families